

Mission 
American Friends Musées d'Orsay et de l'Orangerie (AFMO) is dedicated to raising public awareness and financial support for the Musée d’Orsay and its sister institution the Musée de l’Orangerie. AFMO supports the museums' acquisitions, collection conservation, special exhibitions, education programs, and capital improvements.

AFMO is a public, not-for-profit charitable organization and is recognized by the Internal Revenue Service as an American 501(c)(3) organization.

History
Since its inception in 2009, with the support of Director Guy Cogeval and founding members Dr. Seonaid McArthur and Sherry Johnson, AFMO has been committed to nurturing collaborative French-American partnerships in the arts on behalf of the Orsay and Orangerie museums.

 2009: Founding Board of Directors was formed, and AFMO was approved as an US-based 501(c)(3) non-profit organization.
 2010: The Orangerie and Orsay museums joined administratively while AFMO offices were formed inside the museum. The Board continued to expand, Bernard Duhaime became Treasurer, and the Framework Agreement was established. Sherry Johnson formed a Paris Committee to plan the American Friends’ first gala.
 2011: AFMO celebrated its formal announcement at the American Embassy in Paris. Spencer Hays joined the Board of Directors and Peter and Susan Solomon became Board Co-Chairs. Dr. Seonaid McArthur became Executive Director. A Founder’s Gala was held on November 12 celebrating AFMO’s launch.
 2012: A Framework for Gifts of Art from Americans to the Musée d’Orsay was signed laying the groundwork for future gifts.
 2016: Marlene and (the late) Spencer Hays pledged their collection of more than 600 masterworks to the Orsay. The largest foreign collection of art to be donated to France, more than 600 masterworks from the late 19th and early 20th centuries, including works by Pierre Bonnard, Edouard Vuillard, Amedeo Modigliani and Henri Matisse, among others.

Musée d'Orsay 
The Musée d’Orsay is a museum in Paris, France, celebrated for its collection of mainly French art dating from 1848 to 1914, ranging from paintings, sculptures, furniture, and photography. Housed in the former Gare d'Orsay, a Beaux-Arts railway station built between 1898 and 1900, the museum holds the largest collection of Impressionist and post-Impressionist masterpieces in the world, by painters including Berthe Morisot, Claude Monet, Édouard Manet, Degas, Renoir, Cézanne, Seurat, Sisley, Gauguin, and van Gogh.

Musée de l'Orangerie 
The Musée de l’Orangerie is an art gallery of impressionist and post-impressionist paintings located in the Tuileries Garden in Paris. The museum is most famous as the permanent home of eight large Water Lilies murals by Claude Monet, and also contains works by Paul Cézanne, Henri Matisse, Amedeo Modigliani, Pablo Picasso, Pierre-Auguste Renoir, Henri Rousseau, Alfred Sisley, Chaïm Soutine, and Maurice Utrillo.

Annual "Weekend in Paris" Gala Program 

In 2013, AFMO inaugurated its first “Weekend in Paris” Gala Program which takes place every October. Members gather for a weekend around exclusive visits, heritage and museum tours, and private art viewings in the French capital and its surroundings before attending the annual the Gala Evening at the Orsay, AFMO's premier fundraising event.

Contemporary Art Program
Since 2018, AFMO has been the main sponsor of the Contemporary Art Program at both museums, showcasing works by esteemed contemporary artists such as David Hockney, Glenn Ligon, Alek Katz, Julian Schnabel, Kehinde Wiley and Mickalene Thomas, to create an ongoing dialogue with the Orsay and Orangerie permanent collections.

External links 
Additional information can be found on AFMO's website: https://aforsay.org/

Musée d'Orsay
France–United States relations
Non-profit organizations based in New York City
2009 establishments in the United States
Arts organizations established in 2009